Stuart Mackenzie (5 April 1936 - 20 October 2020) was an Australian rower. He was an Australian champion and Olympic medalist, who also competed for Great Britain at the 1962 World Championships.

Club and state rowing
Mackenzie was educated at The King's School in Sydney where he took up rowing. He matriculated in 1954. His senior club rowing was from the Sydney Rowing Club.

International representative rowing
Mackenzie won a silver medal in single sculls at the 1956 Summer Olympics in Melbourne. He was reputed to have miscounted the distance, due to not realising the spacing of the buoys changed from 100 m to 50 m in the last 250 m of the race, and so stopped temporarily while still 100 metres from the finish.

Mackenzie visited South Africa in 1958, and rowed on the Vaal River at Billabong, near Vereeniging. He took part in the SA Championships and won the double sculls event with his trainee, John Eden.

At the 1958 British Empire and Commonwealth Games he won a gold medal in single sculls and also set a Commonwealth Games record (7:20.1 mins), and he received a silver medal in double sculls with Mervyn Wood.

He won the Diamond Challenge Sculls at Henley Royal Regatta six times, consecutively, from 1957 to 1962, and won the Silver Goblets partnering Christopher Davidge in 1963, and the Double Sculls, also with Davidge, in 1959. He was also noted for his gamesmanship, including going out for practice sessions wearing a bowler hat.

Mackenzie took part in an event of the Henley Royal Regatta where he was way ahead of all other rowers when he stopped rowing and tried to adjust his cap. However, the reason was to give time to his opponents to catch up with him as it happened. Then he started rowing again and he easily managed to get away, be faster and end first.

Although favoured to win the gold medal at the 1960 Olympic Games in Rome, he fell ill before the race and had to withdraw.

After refusing to return to Australia from Europe for trials for the 1962 British Empire and Commonwealth Games to be held in Perth, Mackenzie rowed for Great Britain at the 1st World Rowing Championships in Lucerne, finishing second to his great rival Vyacheslav Ivanov.

Mackenzie was inducted into the Sport Australia Hall of Fame in 1985.

References

External links
 

1937 births
2020 deaths
Australian male rowers
Rowers at the 1956 Summer Olympics
Olympic rowers of Australia
Medalists at the 1956 Summer Olympics
Olympic medalists in rowing
Olympic silver medalists for Australia
Rowers at the 1958 British Empire and Commonwealth Games
Commonwealth Games gold medallists for Australia
Commonwealth Games silver medallists for Australia
Sport Australia Hall of Fame inductees
Commonwealth Games medallists in rowing
World Rowing Championships medalists for Great Britain
European Rowing Championships medalists
20th-century Australian people
21st-century Australian people
Medallists at the 1958 British Empire and Commonwealth Games